Future on Fire (1991) is a science fiction anthology edited by American writer Orson Scott Card.  It contains fifteen stories written in the 1980s by different writers.

Story list 
The stories in this book are:

"Rachel in Love" (1987) novelette by Pat Murphy
"Dogfight" (1985) novelette by William Gibson and Michael Swanwick
"A Gift from the GrayLanders" (1985) novelette by Michael Bishop
"Fire Zone Emerald" (1986) novelette by Lucius Shepard
"Down and Out in the Year 2000" (1986) short story by Kim Stanley Robinson
"Angel Baby" (1982) novelette by Rachel Pollack
"The Neighbor's Wife" (1985) poem by Susan Palwick
"I Am the Burning Bush" (1982) short story by Gregg Keizer
"Pretty Boy Crossover" (1986) short story by Pat Cadigan
"Buffalo Gals, Won't You Come Out Tonight" (1987) novelette by Ursula K. Le Guin
"All My Darling Daughters" (1985) novelette by Connie Willis
"In the Realm of the Heart, in the World of the Knife" (1985) short story by Wayne Wightman
"Rat" (1986) short story by James Patrick Kelly
"Vestibular Man" (1985) novelette by Felix C. Gotschalk
"Green Days in Brunei" (1985) novella by Bruce Sterling

Related works
Future on Ice (1998) Companion collection of 1980's stories.

1991 anthologies
Future1 Future on Fire
Tor Books books